Howard John Clinebell (June 3, 1922 – April 13, 2005) was a minister in the United Methodist Church and a professor in pastoral counseling. He pioneered a counseling approach that combined psychotherapy and religion.

Life and career 

Howard Clinebell was born in Springfield, Illinois on June 3, 1922 to Howard J. and Clem (Whittenberg) Clinebell. He "graduated from DePauw University in Indiana and Garrett Theological Seminary in Illinois. He earned a doctorate at Columbia University in New York City." In addition he studied psychotherapy at the William Alanson White Institute in New York City.

In the mid-1950s Clinebell joined the staff at the First United Methodist Church in Pasadena. He went on to become counselor at Methodist Hospital in Arcadia. In 1959 he joined the Claremont faculty as a professor of pastoral psychology. Clinebell retired in 1988.

Clinebell is author or co-author of more than 20 books of which the most influential are "Understanding and Counseling the Alcoholic Through Religion and Psychology" (1956) and "Basic Types of Pastoral Counseling" (1966, revised edition "Basic Types of Pastoral Care and Counseling" 1984). With his book on counseling of alcoholics Clinebell introduced the concept to view alcoholism as a disease rather than a character deficiency in religious circles. As one of the fathers of the  pastoral counseling movement Clinebell was an early advocate of training in psychotherapy for seminarians aiming to work as counselors. He was a founding member of the American Association of Pastoral Counselors.

Besides pastoral counseling Clinebell addressed topics like personal problems in the context of relationships, the effects of social systems on individual lives, and the relationship of human beings to the environment.

Clinebell died April 13, 2005 of complications from Parkinson's disease at Vista del Monte Retirement Community in Santa Barbara.

References

Works

External links 

Howard John Clinebell papers, 1949-2002 at Pitts Theology Library, Candler School of Theology

1922 births
2005 deaths
Alcohol abuse counselors
American United Methodist clergy
Neurological disease deaths in California
Deaths from Parkinson's disease
20th-century American clergy